South Street Park is a former baseball ground located in Indianapolis, Indiana, U.S. The ground was home to the Indianapolis Blues of the National League for the 1878 season and was also known then as National Park. The ground first hosted baseball for the city's International Association entry during 1876–1877. It was also a neutral site for some Chicago White Stockings games during 1878.

The ballfield was located on a block bounded by Delaware Street (west), South Street (south), and Alabama Street (east). The site was later occupied by Big Four freight houses. It is currently a parking lot for Gainbridge Fieldhouse, which is across the street to the west.

See also
List of baseball parks in Indianapolis

References
Peter Filichia, Professional Baseball Franchises, Facts on File, 1993.

Defunct baseball venues in the United States
Sports venues in Indianapolis
Baseball venues in Indiana
Defunct sports venues in Indiana